Petra Kocsán (born 4 June 1998) is a Hungarian footballer who plays as a forward and has appeared for the Hungary women's national team.

Career
Kocsán has been capped for the Hungary national team, appearing for the team during the 2019 FIFA Women's World Cup qualifying cycle.

References

External links
 
 
 

1998 births
Living people
Hungarian women's footballers
Hungary women's international footballers
Women's association football forwards
TSG 1899 Hoffenheim (women) players
Hungarian expatriate sportspeople in Germany
Expatriate women's footballers in Germany